Lucius Hedius Rufus Lollianus Avitus was a Roman senator active in the first quarter of the second century AD. He was suffect consul in the nundinium of September to December AD 114 with Marcus Messius Rusticus as his colleague. Many of the inscriptions referring to Avitus used the shorter form of his name, Lucius Lollianus Avitus. He is primarily known through inscriptions.

His family origins lie in Liguria. Avitus is also known to have had at least one son, Lucius Hedius Rufus Lollianus Avitus.

Only one office is known to be held by Avitus, proconsular governor of Asia in 128/129, which was considered the peak of a successful senatorial career.

References 

2nd-century Romans
Suffect consuls of Imperial Rome
Rufus Lollianus Avitus (consul 114), Lucius Hedius
Roman governors of Asia